Al-Nasr Sports, Cultural and Social Club (also known locally as Al-Malik, or "The King", or just plainly as Al-Nasr) is an Omani sports club based in Salalah, Oman. The club is currently playing in the Oman Professional League, top division of Oman Football Association. Their home ground is Al-Saada Stadium, but they also recognize the older Salalah Sports Complex as their home ground. Both stadiums are government owned, but Al-Nasr S.C.S.C. also own their own personal stadium and sports equipment, as well as their own training facilities. Also Al-Nasr is famous for producing some of the greatest and most successful Omani footballers, such as Ali Al-Habsi, Hashim Saleh and Fawzi Bashir.

History
Al-Nasr S.C.S.C. started off playing in the Al-Haffa district of Salalah organizing specific meetings to play beach soccer. This eventually evolved into something very large. The club was founded on 20 May 1972,under sheikh/ Bakhit Said ALShanfari on the same day as fierce rivals Dhofar S.C.S.C. and was registered on 26 June 2002. As football was their main sport, Al-Nasr shifted to playing on grass fields in order to become a professional club. The club name literally translates from "The Victory" in the Arabic language. Such a name quite well suites a sports club in the Arab world. A club named "Al-Nasr" is commonly found in the Middle East. Some clubs with the same name can be found in Saudi Arabia, the United Arab Emirates, Libya, Kuwait and Bahrain.

In 1972 Al-Nasr was merged with Al-Shate'a team to carry the name of Al-Nasr. With this merge, the club office moved from Al-Haffa region to Al-Jouf region, where the current headquarters of the club is located.

In 1986, Al-Nasr competed in the Gulf Club Champions Cup and finished with third place.

Al-Nasr, along with the neighbors Dhofar have been generally labelled as the front runners of the Omani League, but as seen in the recent seasons, both the clubs performed horribly with Dhofar losing many games, and not going far in the Sultan Qaboos Cup, along with Al-Nasr who even got relegated in the 2010–11 season. In the 2008–09 season, Al-Nasr settled to the 10th position in the league which was one of their worst performances ever in the Omani League. In the 2009–10 season also they could make it only to the 7th position in the league and were knocked out by Muscat FC in the Round-of-16 in the Sultan Qaboos Cup. In the 2010–11 season they again had to fight a relegation battle but this time they couldn't make it and got relegated for the first time to the Second Division league. Then in the 2011–12 season they secured the 2nd position in the 2nd Division League and got promoted back to the Omani League (First Division). In the 2012–13 season they bounced back and secured the 4th position in the Omani League.

Being a multisport club
Although being mainly known for their football, Al-Nasr S.C.S.C. like many other clubs in Oman, have not only football in their list, but also hockey, volleyball, handball, basketball, badminton and squash. They also have various youth football teams competing in Oman Olympic League, Oman Youth League (U-19) and Oman Youth League (U-17).

Crest and colours
Al-Nasr S.C.S.C. have been known since establishment to wear a full blue or white (Away) kit (usually a darker shade of blue), varying themselves from neighbors Al-Ittihad (Green), Dhofar S.C.S.C. (Red) and Salalah SC (Blue) kits. They have also had many different sponsors over the years. As of now, Kelme provides them with kits. Currently, Jeep and Al-Shanfari Marbles are featured on the team's shirt.

Logo
Al-Nasr's logo has been recreated a few number of times. The most recent logo (as shown on this page) was created during the late 1980s or early 1990s, giving the club a more attractive logo, opposed to the older, duller-looking one. Although bearing quite a difference, the influence of the older-logo is still seen when compared to the newer version. Also note that the only scripture of the logo is only written in Arabic, a sign of being an older sports club logo compared to other Omani clubs which usually feature English scripture.

Honours and achievements

National titles
Omani League (5):
Winners: 1979–80, 1980–81, 1988–89, 1997–98, 2003–04.
Runners-up: 1982–83, 1984–85, 1989–90 1998–99, 1999–00.

Sultan Qaboos Cup (5):
Winners: 1995, 2000, 2002, 2005, 2017-18.
Runners-up: 1981, 1986, 1987, 1988, 1999, 2001.

Oman Professional League Cup (1):
Winners: 2015-16.
Runners-up:

Oman Super Cup (1):
Winners: 2018.
Runners-up: 2002.

Oman First Division League (0):
Runners-up 2011–12

Youth
Sultan Qaboos Cup (U-19) (2):
Winners 2000, 2001
Oman Youth League (U-19) (1):
Winners 1997–98
Oman Youth League (U-16) (3):
Winners 1985–86, 1990–91, 1998–99

Honours and achievements (other sports)
Hockey
Oman Hockey Premier League (1):
Winners 2008
Sultan Qaboos Cup (3):
Winners 2006, 2007, 2014
National Youth Championship (U-19) (0):
Runners-up 2007
Regional Youth Championship (U-19) (3):
Winners 2000, 2001, 2007
Runners-up 2003
Regional Youth Championship (U-16) (1):
Winners 2007
Runners-up 2008

Table Tennis
National Championship (0):
Runners-up 2007
Regional Championship (5):
Winners 2000, 2001, 2003, 2004, 2005

Basketball
National Championship (0):
Runners-up 2003
Regional Youth Championship (6):
Winners 2000, 2001, 2002, 2003, 2004, 2005

Handball
Second Division League (1):
Winners 2005
National Youth Championship (U-19) (1):
Winners 2005
National Youth Championship (U-16) (0):
Runners-up 2003, 2004

Cycling
Regional Championship (6):
Winners 2000, 2001, 2002, 2003, 2004, 2005

Club performance-International Competitions

AFC competitions
Asian Club Championship : 1 appearance
1990–91 : First Round
Asian Cup Winners' Cup : 1 appearance
1996–97 : Quarter-Finals
AFC Cup : 4 appearances
2006 : Quarter-Finals

UAFA competitions
Gulf Club Champions Cup: 2 appearances
2006 : Group Stage
2007 : Semi-Finals

Players

First team squad

|-----
! colspan="9" bgcolor="#B0D3FB" align="left" |
|----- bgcolor="#DFEDFD"

|-----
! colspan="9" bgcolor="#B0D3FB" align="left" |
|----- bgcolor="#DFEDFD"

|-----
! colspan="9" bgcolor="#B0D3FB" align="left" |
|----- bgcolor="#DFEDFD"

Personnel

Technical staff

References

External links
Al-Nasr S.C.S.C. – SOCCERWAY.com
Al-Nasr S.C.S.C. – GOALZZ.com

 
Football clubs in Oman
Oman Professional League
Salalah
Association football clubs established in 1970
1970 establishments in Oman